Take Off Your Clothes and Live! is a 1963 British naturist film directed by Arnold Louis Miller. It was partly shot in the south of France.

Premise
Various nudists gather in the south of France.

References

External links
[https://www.imdb.com/title/tt0056551/ Take Off Your Clothes and Live!] at IMDb

British drama films
1963 films
Nudity in film
1960s English-language films
1960s British films